The list of shipwrecks in 1951 includes ships sunk, foundered, grounded, or otherwise lost during 1951.

January

3 January

5 January

7 January

8 January

16 January

17 January

18 January

20 January

22 January

23 January

28 January

29 January

Unknown date

February

1 February

2 February

4 February

14 February

16 February

18 February

20 February

26 February

Unknown date

March

10 March

14 March

16 March

21 June

24 March

April

3 April

8 April

9 April

12 April

13 April

16 April

20 April

27 April

May

3 May

5 May

10 May

14 May

17 May

24 May

June

10 June

14 June

23 June

29 June

July

1 July

2 July

4 July

7 July

12 July

13 July

19 July

23 July

25 July

29 July

August

3 August

7 August

9 August

11 August

13 August

15 August

16 August

20 August

21 August

22 August

September

1 September

3 September

4 September

9 September

10 September

13 September

14 September

21 September

27 September

28 September

October

1 October

3 October

6 October

7 October

12 October

14 October

15 October

18 October

19 October

21 October

25 October

29 October

30 October

November

3 November

4 November

5 November

6 November

15 November

17 November

29 November

Unknown date

December

6 December

12 December

13 December

14 December

17 December

20 December

21 December

25 December

26 December

28 December

29 December

30 December

31 December

Unknown date

References

1951
 
Ships